Giant bamboo is a common name for several large species of bamboo and may refer to:
 Large species in the genus Bambusa include:
 "Giant timber bamboo" (Bambusa oldhamii), a large (to 20 m) bamboo species originating from Taiwan
 Bambusa balcooa larger (to 25 m) from Indo-China
 Moso Bamboo (Phyllostachys edulis) a commercial species used for timber, crafts and its edible shoots, found in Japan, Taiwan,  and China.
 "Madagascar giant bamboo" (Cathariostachys madagascariensis), a bamboo species found in Madagascar
 species in the genus Dendrocalamus found from the Indian subcontinent throughout Southeast Asia
 species of the genus Gigantochloa found in tropical Southeast Asia
 species of the genus Guadua concentrated in the Amazon basin and the Orinoco basin

See also
 Bamboo